The Kerala State Film Award for Best Dubbing Artist is an award presented annually at the Kerala State Film Awards of India to the best dubbing in Malayalam film industry. Ideally, there is a male and female winner for the award. Until 1997, the awards were managed directly by the Department of Cultural Affairs of the Government of Kerala. Since 1998, the awards have been controlled by the Kerala State Chalachitra Academy, an autonomous, non-profit institution functioning under the Department of Cultural Affairs. The winners (male and female) receives a certificate, statuette and a cash prize of ₹50,000 each.

Superlatives

Consecutive wins

Winners

References

External links
Official website
PRD, Govt. of Kerala: Awardees List

Kerala State Film Awards
Voice acting awards